St. Pancras South West was a constituency represented in the House of Commons of the Parliament of the United Kingdom. It elected one Member of Parliament (MP) by the first past the post system of election. It was created in 1918 by the division of St Pancras South into South East and South West divisions, and abolished in 1950.

Boundaries 

The constituency comprised the south western part of the Metropolitan Borough of St Pancras. It consisted of wards Four, Five and Seven, as they existed in 1918.

In 1950 the constituency was split between Holborn and St Pancras South (wards Five and Seven) and St Pancras North (ward Four).

Members of Parliament

Elections

Elections in the 1910s

Elections in the 1920s

Elections in the 1930s 

General Election 1939–40

Another General Election was required to take place before the end of 1940. The political parties had been making preparations for an election to take place and by the Autumn of 1939, the following candidates had been selected;
Conservative: George Mitcheson
Labour: Haydn Davies

Elections in the 1940s

References 

 

Parliamentary constituencies in London (historic)
Constituencies of the Parliament of the United Kingdom established in 1918
Constituencies of the Parliament of the United Kingdom disestablished in 1950